Hadenoecus subterraneus, the common cave cricket, is a species of camel cricket in the family Rhaphidophoridae. It is found in North America.

References

Further reading

External links

 

Rhaphidophoridae
Insects described in 1861